Maurice Percy Ashley  (4 September 1907 – 26 September 1994) was a British historian of the 17th Century and editor of The Listener. He published over thirty books, of which his Financial and Commercial Policy Under the Commonwealth Protectorate (1934) achieved wide academic influence, while his biographies Cromwell (1937) and General Monck (1976) received particular praise.

Background and education
Ashley was educated at St Paul's School and New College, Oxford, where he won the Stanhope Essay Prize (1928, 'Republicanism in the reign of Charles II') and the Gladstone Memorial (1930, 'The rise of Latitudinarianism in the Church of England'), and achieved first-class honours in Modern History in 1929. He went on to take a DPhil, studying under David Ogg, and it was his doctoral thesis that became Financial and Commercial Policy Under the Commonwealth Protectorate. Ashley's father worked as an official at the Board of Trade.

Career
In 1929 he was appointed literary assistant to Winston Churchill, who had just begun work on his biography Marlborough: His Life and Times. Ashley provided Churchill with original material from archives in Britain and Europe, earning £300 a year for this half-time employment. Although he was unimpressed by Ashley's socialistic views, Churchill praised his "competence and industry as an historical investigator". Ashley later wrote Churchill as Historian (1968), a perceptive analysis of Churchill's methods.

Ashley's career as a journalist began when he joined the staff of the Manchester Guardian as a leader writer in 1933, moving to The Times in 1937 as a foreign sub-editor. He continued to write, publishing Oliver Cromwell: the Conservative Dictator in 1937 and his own short book on Marlborough in 1939.  He was briefly editor of Britain Today in 1939-40 but in 1940 enlisted in the Grenadier Guards, later being transferred to the Intelligence Corps. By 1945 he had achieved the rank of major.

After World War II, he joined the BBC's weekly publication, The Listener, as Deputy Editor and was appointed Editor in 1958, in which job he remained until retiring in 1967. He broadened the range of the journal, which had been a vehicle for the text of selected broadcasts and criticism of radio and then television programmes. Under Ashley, The Listener'''s book reviews played a leading role in killing off the 19th-century tradition of anonymous reviewing.

Among a number of books, Ashley's publications in this period included his The Greatness of Oliver Cromwell (1957), a substantial revision of his earlier view of Cromwell, and The Glorious Revolution of 1688 (1966).  After retiring from The Listener, the rate of his publications increased, helped by a two-year research fellowship at Loughborough University.  This period saw the publication of his studies of Charles II, James II, Prince Rupert, and his General Monck (1977), regarded as one of his best books. His last book, The Battle of Naseby and the Fall of King Charles I'' (1992), appeared when he was 85.

He died on 26th September, 1994 and was buried in a family grave in Highgate Cemetery.

Awards
Ashley was awarded a CBE in 1978 and a DLitt from Oxford in 1979. He was President of the Cromwell Association from 1961 to 1977.

Personal life
He married twice, first in 1935 to Phyllis Mary Griffiths, with whom he had a son and a daughter, and second in 1988 to Patricia Entract.

References

20th-century British writers
1994 deaths
1907 births
Burials at Highgate Cemetery
Academics of Loughborough University
Commanders of the Order of the British Empire
People educated at St Paul's School, London
Alumni of New College, Oxford